LeRoy J. Louden (born October 12, 1936) is an American politician and former state senator in the unicameral Nebraska Legislature. He is also a rancher. 

Personal life
Born in 1936 in Alliance, Nebraska, LeRoy Louden is a graduate of St. Agnes Academy and Nebraska State Trade School. He was married in 1999 and has six children. He is a member of the Nebraska Cattlemen, Elks Club, Fraternal Order of Eagles, and a former secretary of the Dist #119 school board.

State legislature
He was elected in 2002 to represent the 49th Nebraska legislative district. He was reelected in 2004 and 2008.

References
 
 

1936 births
Living people
Nebraska state senators
People from Alliance, Nebraska
People from Sheridan County, Nebraska
American cattlemen
Ranchers from Nebraska